The Redditch Borough Council elections of 2014 were held on Thursday 22 May, on the same day as the European elections. One third of the Borough was up for re-election.

Election results

Results by Ward

Abbey

Astwood Bank & Feckenham

Batchley & Brockhill

Central

Church Hill

Crabbs Cross

Greenlands

Headless Cross & Oakenshaw

Lodge Park

Winyates

References

2014 English local elections
2014
2010s in Worcestershire